The Tubman family is a prominent Americo-Liberian family from Harper, Liberia. The family is descended from African American slaves, the Tubmans who were owned by a prominent Maryland family. The Tubman family has produced such notable Liberians such as William Tubman and Winston Tubman. 

Tubman family (Liberia)
Americo-Liberian people
Americo-Liberian families
People of Americo-Liberian descent